Peter Williams (27 August 1939 – 20 December 2020) was a British former professional motorcycle racer. He competed in Grand Prix motorcycle road racing from 1966 to 1973. He also competed at many levels on home short-circuit races. He raced many times on the Isle of Man TT course from 1966 to 1973. His father was Jack Williams who ran the Associated Motor Cycles (AMC) race department. Williams trained in mechanical engineering and introduced via racing alloy wheels, an innovation which is commonplace on today's road bikes, and was also an early pioneer of solo-motorcycle disc brakes.

Riding career

Williams was born in Nottingham, England. He started his racing on UK race circuits in 1964 and won the 250 cc class of the 1964 Thruxton 500 race on an AJS model 14 CSR partnered by Tony Wood.

He first entered the Isle of Man Manx Grand Prix in 1964 on a Norton In 1965 he entered the Senior race on his Dunstall Norton Dominator 500 cc twin suffering con-rod breakage of the left cylinder when lying 3rd but scored a third place in Lightweight 250 cc category riding an Orpin Greeves Silverstone.

Williams entered selected Grand Prix races from 1966. He also regularly competed in TT races from 1966, scoring one 1st place and seven 2nd places. He won the 1966 North West 200 500 cc race in Northern Ireland on a Matchless, and placed 2nd in the 250 cc class on a Greeves Silverstone

His best Grand Prix season was in 1967 when he finished in fourth place in the 500cc world championship on a Matchless G50 motorcycle. In early 1967, Williams marketed an engineering solution to enable a proprietary disc brake assembly produced and merchandised by Rickman Motorcycles to be fitted to Manx Norton and AJS 7R/Matchless G50 racing machines. 

He had a long-standing relationship with sponsor Tom Arter, riding his Arter-AJS (350 cc) and Arter-Matchless (500 cc) machines which were later developed with special lightweight frames, disc brakes and six-spoke, solid-cast (non wire-spoked) Elektron wheels dubbed "cart wheels" and artillery wheels by the UK press.

In 1969 Williams and Arter started a new project intended to replace the 1950s Matchless G50-engined machine, with a prototype Weslake twin-cylinder 500 cc engine which was abandoned due to failure of the engine project.

As a Norton employee from 1969, Williams entered larger-capacity races on Norton Commando twins. He teamed with Charley Sanby to win the 1969 Thruxton 500 endurance race and was placed second in the 750 cc class Production TT race in 1970.

Williams won his only world championship race in 1971 in the 350 cc Ulster Grand Prix, and also won the 1973 Isle of Man Formula 750 TT race on a John Player Norton with a semi-monocoque frame, in the role of team designer/rider. The machine was designed as an integrated package with a Peel-type fairing incorporating handlebar blisters which helped to reduce the drag coefficient to 0.39.

His competitive riding career was ended by injuries suffered in a racing accident at Old Hall Corner,  Oulton Park on August Bank Holiday Monday, 26 August 1974, when the fibreglass one-piece fuel tank/seat/tail unit became detached. Williams agreed to an out of court settlement with Norton.

Career after racing

In the 1970s, Williams presented the intelligent face of bikers at public appearances giving open lectures at Universities. He provided insight into the engineering issues of racing the restricted-budget works Norton against multi-cylinder bikes from Japan, highlighting the pros and cons of using the 1940s-designed Norton engine. The crank shaft of the 360-degree parallel twin was supported on only two main bearings and as more power was developed from the engine a noticeable flex could be measured using a dial gauge placed on the end of the shaft.

In the later 1970s, Williams operated a Kawasaki motorcycle dealership in Southampton.

More recently Williams was involved in the development of a carbon-fibre monocoque designed superbike at Lotus Cars and an electric-powered racing bike, the EV-0 RR, planned for an outing at the TTXGP Zero Emissions race at the Isle of Man TT in June 2009.  He has a number of patents relating to frame and engine design.

In 2013, Williams established a new business Peter Williams Motorcycles to recreate a limited number of his 1973 Norton Monocoque race bikes.

Motorcycle Grand Prix results

(key) (Races in bold indicate pole position)

References

Sportspeople from Nottingham
British motorcycle racers
English motorcycle racers
125cc World Championship riders
250cc World Championship riders
350cc World Championship riders
500cc World Championship riders
Isle of Man TT riders
1939 births
2020 deaths